Wilhelm Olsen (12 May 1891 – 6 April 1971) was a Norwegian wrestler. He competed in the Greco-Roman featherweight event at the 1920 Summer Olympics. He represented the club Fagforeningernes TIF

References

External links
 

1891 births
1971 deaths
Sportspeople from Oslo
Olympic wrestlers of Norway
Wrestlers at the 1920 Summer Olympics
Norwegian male sport wrestlers